Luigi Infantino (24 April 1921 – 22 June 1991) was an Italian operatic tenor, particularly associated with the lyric Italian and French repertories.

Luigi Infantino was born in Racalmuto, and studied at the Parma Conservatory with Italo Brancucci. He made his debut in 1943, at the Teatro Regio in Parma, as Rodolfo in La bohème, which was also his debut role at the Teatro San Carlo in Naples, in 1945. With that company, he appeared in London as the Duke in Rigoletto, and Rodolfo. In 1948, he made his debut at the Teatro alla Scala in Milan, as Nadir in Les pêcheurs de perles, later singing Ramiro in La cenerentola, which he also sang that same year at the Verona Arena.

The tenor sang regularly in Naples and Bologna, and made guest appearances at the New York City Opera in 1947:  La traviata (with Enzo Mascherini as Giorgio), Rigoletto (opposite Giuseppe Valdengo and Virginia MacWatters), Madama Butterfly, La bohème, Il barbiere di Siviglia (conducted by Julius Rudel) and Don Giovanni (in Theodore Komisarjevsky's production). In 1949, the tenor went on a concert-tour of England and Australia. In 1954, at the Teatro Fenice in Venice, Infantino sang Edgardo to the Lucia of Maria Callas, in Lucia di Lammermoor.  Infantino toured England again in 1957 giving a concert at Cheltenham among others. At the Teatro dell'Opera di Roma, he created Amleto, by Mario Zefred, in 1961, and La stirpe di Davide by Franco Mannino, in 1962. In 1964 Infantino reprised his role of Edgardo at the Bombay Opera in India, with soprano Celia Baptista as his Lucia. He was also active throughout his career singing on Italian Radio (RAI), where he gave his last performance in 1973, in Mannino's Il diavolo in giardino.

A stylish lyric tenor with an attractive voice, Infantino can be heard in complete recordings of La traviata (EMI, 1946) and Il barbiere di Siviglia (Cetra, 1950, opposite Giuseppe Taddei and Giulietta Simionato). There is also a live recording of Die Meistersinger von Nürnberg, sung in Italian (Melodram, 1962).

 Operissimo.com

Infantino died in Rome, aged 70.

Filmography

1921 births
1991 deaths
People from Racalmuto
Italian operatic tenors
20th-century Italian male opera singers
Musicians from the Province of Agrigento